James McSherry may refer to:

James McSherry Jr. (1819–1869), lawyer and author
James McSherry (Maryland judge) (1842–1907), Chief Judge of the Maryland Court of Appeals, son of James McSherry, Jr
James McSherry (Pennsylvania politician) (1776–1849), Congressional Representative from Pennsylvania